Itatí Department is a  department of Corrientes Province in Argentina.

Settlements
Itatí
Ramada Paso

External links
Itati website 

Departments of Corrientes Province